The Women's Freestyle 53 kg competition of the Wrestling events at the 2015 Pan American Games in Toronto were held on July 16 at the Mississauga Sports Centre.

Schedule
All times are Eastern Daylight Time (UTC-4).

Results
Legend
F — Won by fall
WO - Won by Walkover

Final

Repechage

Notes
 Conder's competitor Elverine Jiménez from Nicaragua was disqualified from the games for doping. As a result, Conder received a Bye at the first round.

References

Wrestling at the 2015 Pan American Games
2015 in women's sport wrestling